The Chorrera Formation (N2ch) is a geological formation of the Bogotá savanna, Altiplano Cundiboyacense, Eastern Ranges of the Colombian Andes. The formation consists of coarse to very coarse conglomerates.

Etymology 
The formation was defined by Helmens and Van der Hammen in 1995 after the La Chorrera waterfall in Subachoque.

Description

Lithologies 
The Chorrera Formation consists of coarse to very coarse conglomerates.

Stratigraphy and depositional environment 
The Chorrera Formation unconformably overlies the Late Cretaceous Guadalupe Group. The formation is overlain by the Pleistocene Subachoque Formation. The age of the Chorrera Formation has been estimated to be Late Pliocene based on its stratigraphical position. The depositional environment is characterised by alluvial fans formed during the main phase of tectonic uplift of the Eastern Ranges in the Late Pliocene. Dutch geologist Salomon Kroonenberg, who studied the Neogene uplift of the Eastern Andes in Colombia, defines the main stage of uplift between six and four million years ago. Other Dutch geologists Helmens, Van der Hammen and Hooghiemstra have pushed back this uplift phase to between 4.5 and 3 Ma. The facies origin of the Chorrera Formation is comparable to the Marichuela Formation, outcropping on the eastern edge of the Bogotá savanna, yet different in stratigraphic position. The deposition of sediments of the Chorrera Formation is time-equivalent with the explosive phase of the Paipa–Iza volcanic complex, active between 4.7 and 3.6 Ma, and the Miocene to Late Pliocene Tilatá Formation.

Outcrops 

The Chorrera Formation is found at its type locality in the synclinal of the Río Frío, east of Subachoque, Cundinamarca.

See also 

 Geology of the Eastern Hills
 Geology of the Ocetá Páramo
 Geology of the Altiplano Cundiboyacense

References

Bibliography

External links 
 

Geologic formations of Colombia
Neogene Colombia
Pliocene Series of South America
Chapadmalalan
Montehermosan
Conglomerate formations
Alluvial deposits
Formations
Formations